Indrani Aikath Gyaltsen (1952–1994) was an Indian novelist and columnist.

Early life

She was born in Chaibasa, Bihar in 1952 to a local coal-mine owner and had a privileged upbringing. She was educated at Loreto Convent School – a premier Catholic School in the nearby city of Jamshedpur, before leaving India to continue her studies at Barnard College, New York City.

Personal life
She was briefly married and was divorced, after which she moved to Calcutta where she was wooed by a succession of men, allegedly rejecting an Indian Army Officer because of "the Punjabi accent" of his spoken English. She ultimately remarried a tea-plantation owner of Tibetan origin and moved to an estate high above Darjeeling in the embattled north-eastern state of Assam.

She ran a hotel there and authored three novels: Daughters of the House, Cranes' Morning (1993) and Hold My Hand, I'm Dying, the last being published posthumously after her suicide.

Mentorship of Khushwant Singh

Indrani wrote to Khushwant Singh, a famous Indian man-of-letters, who answered her letters as he did of many aspiring young Indian writers, encouraging her. She mailed her first novel to him chapter-by-chapter, and he mentioned her to David Davidar, head of Penguin Books in India.

Plagiarism scandal
Soon after its publication, it became clear that her second novel, Cranes' Morning, had been plagiarised from The Rosemary Tree by the English novelist Elizabeth Goudge, which had been published in London by Hodder & Stoughton in 1956. Molly Moore of the Washington Post Foreign Service wrote: "Aikath-Gyaltsen recast the setting to an Indian village, changing the names and switching the religion to Hindu but often keeping the story word-for-word the same". When the plagiarism was uncovered, Crane's Morning had been published by Penguin Books in India and Ballantine Books in the U.S. but not yet in the UK.

Suicide

She died after consuming sodium phosphate (rat poison) in 1994 not long after the plagiarism was discovered. She had come back to her father's ancestral house where she was engaged in a contentious battle over property and assets against her own mother and sister, from whom she was estranged.

Khushwant Singh wrote about her in his book Women and Men in My Life, which he dedicated to her.

Novels
 Daughters of the House (1992) 
 Cranes' Morning (1993) 
 Hold My Hand, I'm Dying (unknown)

References

Gyaltsen
Gyaltsen
Gylatsen
Indian women journalists
Indian women novelists
20th-century Indian journalists
20th-century Indian novelists
20th-century Indian women writers
People involved in plagiarism controversies